Rih Dil (lit. Rih Lake) is a natural lake located in northwestern Chin State in Myanmar. It lies at about 3 kilometers from Zokhawthar, the nearest village situated at an Indo-Burma border. It has a heart-shaped outline. It is about 1 mile in length, half-a-mile in width, about 3 miles in circumference and about 60 feet in depth.

Rih Dil occupies an important status in the traditional religion and folktales of the Chin people including Zomi, Laimi, and Mizo. According to the ancestors of these tribals, the lake was a corridor to their heaven called Pialral. All souls destined to Pialral must pass through the lake. Due to its cultural importance is often referred to as "the largest lake in Mizoram is Rih Dil, which is but in Burma (Myanmar)."

History

Mythological account 
The name of Rid Dil is said derived from a Mizo folktale of a girl named Rih-i. According to legend, Rih-i and her younger sister had a cruel stepmother, who persuaded their father to get rid of them. The father killed the younger sister in a forest. Upon finding her decapitated sister, Rih-i found was inconsolable. A good spirit known as Lasi found her and took pity on her. She revealed her a magical tree having a single leaf with which Rih-i revived her sister back to life. To quench the thirst of her younger sister, Rih-i turned herself into a small pool of water using the same leaf. Later, Rih-i was compelled to change herself into a white mithun, and wandered around in search of a safe place. Her urine formed rih-note (smaller lakes) wherever she went. It is believed that such lakes can still be found in the Vawmlu Range, Zur forest near the village Natchhawng, a place above Bochung village, and the area of Khawthlir village, all of which are in Myanmar. She wandered to Sanzawl village, followed the river Run. But the demon spirit of the river threatened to suck her dry. She migrated westward into Mizoram but found even the valley of Champhai unsuitable. A little further southeast she found the present location, and the lake became Rih Dil.

Traditional account 
However, in another local version, the lake was originally called “Sialkidul” in reference to its shape of the head of a mithun (little similar to gayal) when viewed from far mountain top. After two generations of human settlement in the region, the tradition says that many black-faced people (maivom in native language) invaded the surrounding land and called the lake “Sri,” which later became transliterated to “Rih” or “Li”. The Maivom people settled there for two consecutive harvest-times (two years). The then Guite chief Mangsum I of Ciimnuai ordered them to bring in annual taxes but they refused and started attack some Guite habitations at Geeltui and Losau instead. Therefore, the chief organized a warfare operation against the Maivom and drove them westward across the Tio. In commemoration of this event, local war songs are still in use in the region. Some of them are:

Tuanglam tungah tangpa khau bang ciah’ng, khuhva na tong sia e, tuaklo dawn kawi aw e; khuhva tongsuah tang ka sinlai zen, lumsuang ka tuun kaal in, tungkhai mu’n tuah inla, awi kawi na’ng e. (Gendongh, c. AD 1300)
(Translation):
On my way back from the conquest, heard a dove hanged on the tree above, likely laughing at me; when angrily I picked up some stones to throw them to it, a hovering eagle suddenly snatched it away on my behalf.
Kuansuk ta’ng e, Tiopi dung zui in, Tiopi ah sehtak ah Ciinmang umtui bang ka khuai hi e; namtem tawi in sulzui ta’ng, Tio ii gaal ah pasal lian lu khai ing e. (Vunghsan, c. AD 1300)
(Translation):
Through the stream of Tio, walked down along the bank but sadly lost my brave brother’s life on the sand; holding my sword firmly to avenge for his life crossed the other side of Tio, and now on my way back home with honor of my captives.

Transportation 
Rih Dil is difficult to access due to its remote location. In Myanmar, travelers may use a bus service from Yangon to Monywa in Sagaing Division, from there they can get a 33-seat mini-bus, which is more compatible with the tricky roads of Chin State. Visitors from India can enter from the Indo-Myanmar border gate through Champhai, from where it is 22 km. They pay gate-pass fees of Rs. 10 for a person and go directly to the Rih Lake by public buses.

References 

Lakes of Myanmar
Chin State